The 1908–09 Football League season was Birmingham Football Club's 17th in the Football League and their 9th in the Second Division, to which they were relegated at the end of the 1907–08 season. They began the season well, not dropping out of the top two until December, but gradually fell away until finishing in 11th position in the 20-team division. They also took part in the 1909–10 FA Cup, entering at the first round proper and losing in that round to Portsmouth.

Alex Watson succeeded Alf Jones as secretary-manager at the start of the season. Jones began acting as unpaid secretary for Small Heath Alliance in 1885, the year the club turned professional, became their first paid secretary with responsibility for team matters in 1892, when the club first joined the Football League, and had held the post of secretary-manager ever since.

Twenty-nine players made at least one appearance in nationally organised first-team competition, and there were fifteen different goalscorers. Goalkeeper Jack Dorrington played in 35 of the 39 matches over the season; full-back Billy Beer played one fewer. Beer and Frederick Chapple were joint leading scorers with 8 goals; all of Beer's goals were scored in the league. In September, a 19-year-old called Frank Womack made his Football League debut. He went on to play 515 times for Birmingham in senior competition, 491 in the league, but never scored a goal.

In October, Walter Corbett, who had made his debut for the England senior team earlier in the year, was a member of the gold medal-winning Great Britain Olympic football team at the London Olympics.

Football League Second Division

Note that not all clubs finished their playing season on the same date. Birmingham were in 10th place in the division after their final game, on 24 April, but by the time the fixtures were all complete, on 30 April, they had been overtaken by Gainsborough Trinity and finished 11th.

League table (part)

FA Cup

Appearances and goals

Players with name struck through and marked  left the club during the playing season.

See also
Birmingham City F.C. seasons

References
General
 Matthews, Tony (1995). Birmingham City: A Complete Record. Breedon Books (Derby). .
 Matthews, Tony (2010). Birmingham City: The Complete Record. DB Publishing (Derby). .
 Source for match dates and results: "Birmingham City 1908–1909: Results". Statto Organisation. Retrieved 21 May 2012.
 Source for lineups, appearances, goalscorers and attendances: Matthews (2010), Complete Record, pp. 262–63. Note that attendance figures are estimated.
 Source for kit: "Birmingham City". Historical Football Kits. Retrieved 22 May 2018.

Specific

Birmingham City F.C. seasons
Birmingham